Gauri is a Marathi movie released on 1 December 2006. The movie has been produced by Gajanan Dongre and directed by Vijay Bhanu.

Cast
The cast includes Sonalee Kulkarni,  Kuldeep Pawar, Vikram Gokhale, Priya Bhende, Pradeep Velankar, Kalpana Sathe, Raghavendra Kadkol and Others

Soundtrack
The music has been directed by Sanjay Geete.

References

External links
 Movie review - gomolo.com
Movie Teasers - rajshrimarathi.com

2006 films
2000s Marathi-language films